Kleinella is a small genus of sea snails, pyramidellid gastropod mollusk or micromollusks. This genus is currently placed in the subfamily Turbonillinae.

Shell description
The original description (Adams, 1860) reads: Testa ovata, tenuis, umbilicata, superficie cancellata; spira producta, apice obtuso. Apertura elongata, antice producta et integra; labio tenui, simplici; labro postice angulato, in medio recto, margine acuto. This genus nearly resembles Actaeon, but without any fold on the columella; the umbilicus, moreover, is wide and deep, and the surface of the shell is cancellated. The other lip forms an angle posteriorly with the last whorl, and is straight in the middle."

The description of the type reads: "K. testa oblonga, late et profunde umbilicata; spira elatiuscula, apice obtuso; pallide fusca; anfractibus 3 1/2 convexiusculis (ultimo ventricoso), regulariter cancellatis; apertura ovali; labio tenui, simplici; labro in medio recto, postice angulato. Long. 1/8 poll. Hab. Straits of Korea; dredged from 63 fathoms.

Life habits
Little is known about the biology of the members of this genus. As is true of most members of the Pyramidellidae sensu lato, they are most likely  ectoparasites.

Species
Species within the genus Kleinella include:
 Kleinella amoena
 Kleinella awaziensis Nomura, 1939
 Kleinella cancellaris A. Adams, 1860 - type species
 Kleinella cedrosa (Dall, 1884)
 Kleinella ceylanica (Preston, 1905)
 Kleinella fulva (A. Adams, 1851)
 Kleinella sulcata (A. Adams, 1862)

subgenus Euparthenia
 Kleinella bulinea (Lowe, 1841)
 Kleinella humboldti (Risso, 1826)

See also
 Euparthenia
 Monotygma

References
This article incorporates public domain text from the reference 

 Bernard, P.A. (Ed.) (1984). Coquillages du Gabon [Shells of Gabon]. Pierre A. Bernard: Libreville, Gabon. 140, 75 plates pp.
 Gofas, S.; Afonso, J.P.; Brandào, M. (Ed.). (S.a.). Conchas e Moluscos de Angola = Coquillages et Mollusques d'Angola. [Shells and molluscs of Angola]. Universidade Agostinho / Elf Aquitaine Angola: Angola. 140 pp.
 Vaught, K.C. (1989). A classification of the living Mollusca. American Malacologists: Melbourne, FL (USA). . XII, 195 pp.

External links
 Kleinella sulcata image

Pyramidellidae